Watson Nyambek (born 27 February 1976) from Miri, Sarawak is a Malaysian sprinter. He attended secondary education in SMK St.Columba.
Nyambek, under the tutelage of Canadian coach Daniel St Hilaire, had shot to fame in 1996 during the Malaysia Games, beating reigning 100m sprinter Azmi Ibrahim in the final. Nyambek astonished everyone by clocking 10.38 seconds, eclipsing the national record set by M Jegathesan (10.46 seconds, set during the Asian Games in 1966).
Two years later, Nyambek lowered this record to 10.30 seconds.

Achievements

Personal bests

References

External links

1976 births
Living people
People from Sarawak
Malaysian male sprinters
Athletes (track and field) at the 1996 Summer Olympics
Athletes (track and field) at the 2000 Summer Olympics
Olympic athletes of Malaysia
Athletes (track and field) at the 1998 Commonwealth Games
Athletes (track and field) at the 1998 Asian Games
Southeast Asian Games medalists in athletics
Southeast Asian Games silver medalists for Malaysia
Competitors at the 2001 Southeast Asian Games
Asian Games competitors for Malaysia
Commonwealth Games competitors for Malaysia